Lionel Batley Bull CBE DVSc FAA (27 April 1889 – 5 May 1978), was an Australian veterinary scientist and CSIRO scientific administrator.

References

Fellows of the Australian Academy of Science
Commanders of the Order of the British Empire
Veterinary scientists
1889 births
1978 deaths
People from Hawthorn, Victoria
Scientists from Melbourne